Baghaichari is a union in the Rangamati District in Bangladesh. It is the largest union of the upazila of Baghaichari. It has an area of 11,004.22 acres.

It is bordered by the Marishya Union to the north, Sajek Union and Mizoram (India) to the east, Sarbotali Union to the south, and Kachalong River and Rupokari Union to the west.

Demography
The total population is 10,925 according to 2011 census, of which are indigenous 93% and non-indigenous Muslim 7%. The density of population is 30 per square kilometer (Census 2011). The total population is divided into Bangalees and Chakmas.

Communication
Baghaichari union is 3 kilometers far to the south-east corner from the headquarters  of Bagaichhari Upazila.

Villages and other institution
Baghaichari Union contains twenty five villages, one high schools, eight primary schools, one madrasa, one bazaar, 9 Buddhist temple and 2 mosques.

High schools
 Ugalchari High School

Primary schools
 Middle Ugalchari Government Primary School
 New Lallyaghona Government Primary School
 Ugalchari Mukh Government Primary School
 Lambachara Government Primary School
 Thokkula karbari para Government Primary School
 Shijok Dosor Government Primary School
 Baghaichari Ideal Government Primary School
 Dosor Bazar Government Primary School
 Moroghona Chara Government Primary School

Bazaar
 Dosor Bazaar

Villages
 Ugalchari
 Jibtuli
 Baghaichari
 New Lallyaghona
 Choto Kochuchari
 Boro Kochuchari
 Moddyam Baghaichari
 Chonhola Adam
 Talukder Para
 1 no Rabar Bagan
 2 No Rabar Bagan
 East Lallyaghona
 Sonamia master Para
 Bottuli
 Ugalchari Uttor para
 Ugalchari Dakshin Para
 Lambachara
 Ugalchari Mukh Bottola
 MoroghonaChara
 Bhuiyochara
 Eitgyate
 East Gobochari
 Bodongochara
 Dosor

Rangamati Hill District
Unions of Bagaichhari Upazila